Nicholas Kurti,  (14 May 1908 – 24 November 1998) was a Hungarian-born British physicist who lived in Oxford, UK, for most of his life.

Career
Born in Budapest, Kurti went to high school at the Minta Gymnasium, but due to anti-Jewish laws he had to leave the country, gaining his master's degree at the Sorbonne in Paris. He obtained his doctorate in low-temperature physics in Berlin, working with Professor Franz Simon. Kurti and Simon continued to work together during 1931–1933 at the Technische Hochschule in Breslau. However, when Adolf Hitler rose to power, both Simon and Kurti left Germany, joining the Clarendon Laboratory in the University of Oxford, England.

During World War II, Kurti worked on the Manhattan project, returning to Oxford in 1945. In 1955 he won the Fernand Holweck Medal and Prize. In 1956, Simon and Kurti built a laboratory experiment that reached a temperature of one microkelvin. This work attracted worldwide attention, and Kurti was elected a Fellow of the Royal Society. He later became the society's Vice-President from 1965 to 1967.

Kurti became a Fellow of Brasenose College, Oxford, in 1947 and became Professor of Physics at Oxford in 1967, a post he held until his retirement in 1975. He was also Visiting Professor at City College in New York City, the University of California, Berkeley, and Amherst College in Massachusetts.

Nicholas Kurti was elected as a Fellow of the Royal Society (FRS) in 1956, becoming vice-president in 1965, and was appointed as a Commander of the British Empire (CBE) in 1973.

Personal life
Kurti's hobby was cooking, and he was an enthusiastic advocate of applying scientific knowledge to culinary problems, a field known today as gastrophysics.  In 1969 he gave a talk at the Royal Institution titled "The physicist in the kitchen", in which he amazed the audience by using the recently invented microwave oven to make a "reverse Baked Alaska" — a Frozen Florida — hot liquor enclosed by a shell of frozen meringue. Over the years he organized several international workshops in Erice, Italy on "Molecular and Physical Gastronomy."

References

Bibliography
But the Crackling is Superb: An Anthology on Food and Drink by Fellows and Foreign Members of The Royal Society of London

External links

 The Nicholas Kurti European Prize
 The papers of Nicholas Kurti were catalogued by Anna-K Mayer and Timothy Powell, NCUACS, Bath (England), prior to being deposited in the Bodleian Library, Oxford
 Oral History interview transcript with Nicholas Kurti, 11 September 1968, American Institute of Physics, Niels Bohr Library and Archives
 Physics and joys of life by Professor Nicholas Kurti, 10 March 1989, on YouTube

1908 births
1998 deaths
People from Pest, Hungary
University of Paris alumni
Humboldt University of Berlin alumni
Jewish emigrants from Nazi Germany to the United Kingdom
Hungarian nuclear physicists
20th-century British physicists
Fellows of Brasenose College, Oxford
Hungarian Jews
Molecular gastronomy
Manhattan Project people
Jewish physicists
Fellows of the Royal Society
Commanders of the Order of the British Empire
Members of the German Academy of Sciences at Berlin